Christine Bachoc (born 1964) is a French mathematician known for her work in coding theory, kissing numbers, lattice theory, and semidefinite programming. She is a professor of mathematics at the University of Bordeaux.

Bachoc earned a doctorate in 1989 with the dissertation Réseaux unimodulaires et problèmes de plongement liés à la forme Trace.

In 2011, Bachoc and Frank Vallentin won the Society for Industrial and Applied Mathematics Activity Group on Optimization Prize for their work proving upper bounds on high-dimensional kissing numbers by combining methods from semidefinite programming, harmonic analysis, and invariant theory.

References

External links
Home page

1964 births
Living people
20th-century French mathematicians
French women mathematicians
Academic staff of the University of Bordeaux
21st-century French mathematicians